Elina Johansson (born 27 August 1986) is a Swedish football midfielder.

External links 
 
 Profile at Swedish Football Association (SvFF) 

1986 births
Living people
Swedish women's footballers
Hammarby Fotboll (women) players
Eskilstuna United DFF players
Damallsvenskan players
Women's association football midfielders